The Textile Research Journal is a peer-reviewed scientific journal that covers the field of materials science, especially as applying to textiles. The journal's editor is Dong Zhang. It was established in 1931 and is published by SAGE Publications.

Abstracting and indexing 
The journal is abstracted and indexed in Scopus, and the Science Citation Index Expanded. According to the Journal Citation Reports, its 2020 impact factor is 1.820, ranking it 9th out of 25 journals in the category "Materials Science, Textiles".

References

External links 
 

SAGE Publishing academic journals
English-language journals
Materials science journals
Publications established in 1931